Daryl Gary Reid,  (born November 2, 1950) is a former politician in Manitoba, Canada. He represented the electoral division of Transcona in the Legislative Assembly of Manitoba from 1990 to 2016, serving as a member of the New Democratic Party, and was the speaker of the Legislative Assembly from October 2011 to March 2016.

Early life and career
Reid was born in Winnipeg, Manitoba, to a family that was politically active with the Cooperative Commonwealth Federation and New Democratic Party.  He began working for Canadian National in 1969 and became active in the trade union movement, serving as a shop steward and executive board member for the International Brotherhood of Electrical Workers.  From 1986 to 1990, he was the national president of his railway employees' association.

Member of the Legislative Assembly

Reid was elected to the Manitoba legislature in the 1990 provincial election, defeating Liberal incumbent Richard Kozak.  The Progressive Conservative Party won a majority government in this election, and Reid served as his party's critic for Transportation and the Workers' Compensation Board.  In the latter capacity, he called for the WCB to adopt universal coverage.  He later spoke against a proposed merger of Canadian National and Canadian Pacific, and strongly opposed the federal government's decision to privatize Canadian National.

Reid was re-elected without difficulty in the 1995 election, winning every poll in the Transcona division.  The Progressive Conservatives were re-elected to another majority government, and Reid served as his party's critic for Transportation and Labour.

After eleven years in opposition, the New Democratic Party was returned to government in the 1999 provincial election.  Reid was easily re-elected in Transcona, and became a backbench supporter of Gary Doer's administration.  He led a task force into Manitoba's system of issuing driver's licenses, and chaired a series of public meetings into the status of the province's roads, rails and runways. Re-elected again in 2003, he chaired the committees that selected a new ombudsman and a new auditor general for Manitoba.

In 2005, Reid and fellow NDP MLA Bidhu Jha broke ranks with the Doer government and spoke against plans to create a new hog processing plant in their section of Winnipeg.  After extensive criticism, the government withdrew its support for the project in 2007.

Reid was returned for a fifth time in the 2007 election, in which the NDP were re-elected to a third consecutive majority government.  He now chairs the 2020 Manitoba Transportation Task Force, and serves on the board of directors of the Manitoba Public Insurance Corporation.

Federal politics

Reid supported Lorne Nystrom's bid to lead the federal New Democratic Party in 1995.  In 2003, he endorsed Bill Blaikie.

Electoral history

All electoral information is taken from Elections Manitoba.

References

1950 births
Living people
New Democratic Party of Manitoba MLAs
Politicians from Winnipeg
21st-century Canadian politicians